Árvai  or Árvay is a Hungarian habitational surname originally used for a person coming from the historical Árva County (14th century–1920), which today is divided between Slovakia and Poland. It may refer to:

Árvai/Arvai 

  (born 1974), Hungarian bicycle racer
  (1935–2004), Hungarian sculptor and painter
  (1697–1759), Hungarian monk, poet and teacher
  (1947–2001), Hungarian film director, producer and editor
 Peter Arvai (born 1979), Swedish businessman of Hungarian parentage
  (born 1989), Hungarian actor

Árvay/Arvay 

  (born 1970), Slovak-Hungarian poet and writer
  (1902–1985), Romanian journalist
 Clemens Arvay (born 1980), Austrian biologist and author
  (1790–1871), Hungarian friar, writer and canon
  (born 1964), Slovak politician
  (1818–1889), Hungarian lawyer, writer and journalist
  (1924–1996), Hungarian statistician
 Joseph Arvay (1949–2020), Canadian lawyer
  (1852–1924), Hungarian lawyer
 Margareta Arvay (born 1937), Romanian cross-country skier
  (1708–1750), Jesuit teacher, poet and literary historian
  (born 1935), Hungarian chemical engineer

References

Hungarian-language surnames
Toponymic surnames